Lagurini is a tribe of lemmings in the subfamily Arvicolinae. It contains three species in two genera. Species in this tribe are known as steppe lemmings.

It contains the following species:

 Genus Eolagurus
 Yellow steppe lemming, E. luteus
 Przewalski's steppe lemming, E. przewalskii
 Genus Lagurus
 Steppe lemming, L. lagurus
Phylogenetic evidence based on mtDNA supports the water voles of the genus Arvicola not in fact belonging to the tribe Arvicolini, but rather forming a sister group to the Lagurini. Based on the study, the Lagurini and Arvicola together form a sister group to a clade comprising Hyperacrius and the rest of the Arvicolini.

References 

Mammal tribes
Voles and lemmings